The Goce Delčev Stadium is a multi-purpose stadium in Prilep, North Macedonia. The total capacity is 15,000 (5,684 seats with a VIP/Media capacity of 400) and is named after revolutionary leader Goce Delčev. It is currently used mostly for football matches and is the home stadium of FK Pobeda and FK 11 Oktomvri. The stadium has been used as an alternative home ground of the Toše Proeski Arena for the North Macedonia national football team and has hosted the Macedonian Cup final on two occasions.
In 2021 Goce Delčev Stadium was completed renovated after 5 years.

International fixtures

References

External links
Stadium Info at MacedonianFootball
Stadion Goce Delčev - Prilep
Fotos Goce Delcev

Football venues in North Macedonia
FK Pobeda
FK 11 Oktomvri
Sport in Prilep